Keeper of the Seven Keys is a four-part album series by Helloween, composed of the band's second, third, and eleventh full-length studio albums as well as their third live album.

Part 1 

Keeper of the Seven Keys: Part I is the second studio album by German power metal/heavy metal band Helloween, released in 1987. It is considered to be one of Helloween's best albums, as well credited by many to be the birth of power metal and also including elements made popular during the new wave of British heavy metal. "Future World" was released as a single and a music video was made for "Halloween." The band originally planned to release Keeper of the Seven Keys: Part I and Part II as a double album, but their record label refused, insisting that the albums be released separately.

The album was re-released in 1993 as a double CD with Keeper of the Seven Keys: Part II. It included the bonus tracks "Don't Run for Cover", "Living Ain't No Crime", and "Savage".

Part 2 

Keeper of the Seven Keys: Part II is Helloween's third studio album, released in 1988. The album capitalized on the success of Keeper of the Seven Keys: Part I and picks up where it left off. Michael Weikath starts to come back into the picture as one of the premier songwriters in the band writing some of the most popular tracks to date. The album is one of the most influential power metal albums of all time, and many say that it really shows off the band's talent during this period. Success bloomed all over Europe, Asia and even the United States. The album went gold in Germany and reached #108 in the US.

The album starts off with a short instrumental "Invitation". The second track, "Eagle Fly Free" became a trademark of the band after this album. "You Always Walk Alone" and "We Got The Right" were written by Michael Kiske, then a new member of the band. "Rise And Fall" is more a classic metal-sounding song played at breakneck speed and comical lyrics. "Save Us'" and "March of Time" were written by founder Kai Hansen.

The album contains two singles, which are "Dr. Stein" and "I Want Out". "Dr. Stein" has a very long and moody solo, played with a blues tinge, very unlike other solos in the album as well as an organ solo. "I Want Out" remains one of the band's most popular songs, and has been covered by Gamma Ray, HammerFall, LORD and Sonata Arctica. This song was written by Kai Hansen, and it's rumored to have to do with how he felt about Helloween, that maybe the band wasn't his anymore. The title track is the longest song of the album. Michael Weikath's  "Eagle Fly Free", one of the well known songs of the album has also been covered, as Kai Hansen's "I Want Out", by bands like Vision Divine, and Bassinvaders.

The album was re-released in 1993 as a double CD with Keeper of the Seven Keys: Part I. It included the bonus tracks "Don't Run for Cover", "Living Ain't No Crime", and "Savage".

The Legacy 

Keeper of the Seven Keys – The Legacy is Helloween's eleventh studio album, released October 31, 2005. The musicians, Andi Deris (vocals), Michael Weikath (guitar), Markus Grosskopf (bass), Sascha Gerstner (guitar) and new addition Dani Löble (drums, ex-Rawhead Rexx), see this recording in direct context with their 1987 and 1988 classics Keeper of the Seven Keys: Part I and Part II. The album is a double CD with nearly 80 minutes playing time and comes in a digipack with 6 flaps. Keeper of the Seven Keys - The Legacy leans more towards the genre of progressive metal than the previous album, Rabbit Don't Come Easy, which was much more of a power metal album. It was produced by Charlie Bauerfeind (Blind Guardian, Halford, Rage) and features Blackmore's Night singer Candice Night on the track "Light the Universe".

The Legacy World Tour 2005/2006 

Keeper of the Seven Keys – The Legacy World Tour 2005/2006 is a live album by Helloween, released in February 2007, recorded in São Paulo (Brazil), Sofia (Bulgaria) and Tokyo (Japan).

References 

Album series
Helloween albums